Invasive may refer to:
Invasive (medical) procedure
Invasive species
Invasive observation, especially in reference to surveillance
Invasively progressive spread of disease from one organ in the body to another, especially in reference to cancer, see invasion (cancer)

See also
Intruder (disambiguation)
Invasion (disambiguation)
Intrusive (disambiguation)
Invasive procedure (disambiguation)